The men's high jump was one of four men's jumping events on the Athletics at the 1964 Summer Olympics program in Tokyo. Qualification was held on October 20, 1964, with the final on October 21. 29 athletes from 20 nations entered, with 1 not starting in the qualification round. The maximum number of athletes per nation had been set at 3 since the 1930 Olympic Congress. The event was won by Valeriy Brumel of the Soviet Union, the nation's second consecutive victory in the men's high jump. Brumel, who had earned silver in 1960, and American John Thomas, who had previously taken bronze in 1960 and now won silver, became the first two men to win multiple medals in the Olympic high jump. John Rambo, also of the United States, won bronze to complete the podium.

Background

This was the 15th appearance of the event, which is one of 12 athletics events to have been held at every Summer Olympics. The returning finalists from the 1960 Games were gold medalist Robert Shavlakadze and silver medalist Valery Brumel of the Soviet Union, bronze medalist John Thomas of the United States, fifth-place finisher Stig Pettersson and seventh-place finisher Kjell-Åke Nilsson of Sweden, twelfth-place finisher Mahamat Idriss of France (now of independent Chad), and sixteenth-place finisher Gordon Miller of Great Britain. While Shavlakadze and Brumel beating Thomas had been a major upset in 1960, Brumel had been the best jumper in the intervening four years—improving the world record six times—and was now the favorite. Brumel and Thomas had faced off nine times since 1960, with Brumel winning eight and Thomas one.

Bulgaria, Chad, the Republic of the Congo, Peru, Spain, and Thailand each made their debut in the event. The United States appeared for the 15th time, having competed at each edition of the Olympic men's high jump to that point.

Competition format

The competition used the two-round format introduced in 1912. There were two distinct rounds of jumping with results cleared between rounds. The qualifying round had the bar set at 1.90 metres, 1.95 metres, 2.00 metres, 2.03 metres, and 2.06 metres. All jumpers clearing 2.06 metres in the qualifying round advanced to the final. The final had jumps at 1.90 metres, 1.95 metres, 2.00 metres, 2.03 metres, 2.06 metres, 2.09 metres, 2.12 metres, and then increased by 0.02 metres until a winner was found. Each athlete had three attempts at each height.

Records

These were the standing world and Olympic records (in metres) prior to the 1964 Summer Olympics.

Valeriy Brumel, John Thomas and John Rambo all equalled the Olympic record with 2.16 metres. Brumel and Thomas then set a new Olympic record with 2.18 metres.

Schedule

All times are Japan Standard Time (UTC+9)

Results

Qualifying

Jumpers had to pass 2.06 metres to qualify for the final. The bar started at 1.90 metres, increasing gradually to 2.06 metres. Each jumper had three attempts at each height or could skip any lower height (but could not return to a lower height if he determined that he could not succeed).

Final

Each jumper again had three attempts at each height, with the bar starting at 1.90 metres. Three jumpers were unable to perform as well as they had in the qualification.

References

Athletics at the 1964 Summer Olympics
High jump at the Olympics
Men's events at the 1964 Summer Olympics